Palos Park is a village in southwestern Cook County, Illinois, United States. Per the 2020 census, the population was 4,899.

Geography
Palos Park is located at  (41.665682, -87.836633).

Demographics
As of the 2020 census there were 4,899 people, 2,104 households, and 1,370 families residing in the village. The racial makeup of the village was 88.32% White, 1.43% African American, 0.16% Native American, 2.10% Asian, 0.04% Pacific Islander, 2.14% from other races, and 5.80% from two or more races. Hispanic or Latino of any race were 7.06% of the population.

There were 2,104 households, out of which 35.55% had children under the age of 18 living with them, 59.70% were married couples living together, 4.13% had a female householder with no husband present, and 34.89% were non-families. 33.08% of all households were made up of individuals, and 23.91% had someone living alone who was 65 years of age or older. The average household size was 2.79 and the average family size was 2.21.

The village's age distribution consisted of 15.9% under the age of 18, 2.9% from 18 to 24, 13.2% from 25 to 44, 33.3% from 45 to 64, and 34.8% who were 65 years of age or older. The median age was 58.8 years. For every 100 females, there were 82.4 males. For every 100 females age 18 and over, there were 80.2 males.

The median income for a household in the village was $114,020, and the median income for a family was $135,625. Males had a median income of $101,420 versus $35,625 for females. The per capita income for the village was $63,500. About 0.7% of families and 3.1% of the population were below the poverty line, including 0.0% of those under age 18 and 6.5% of those age 65 or over.

Note: the US Census treats Hispanic/Latino as an ethnic category. This table excludes Latinos from the racial categories and assigns them to a separate category. Hispanics/Latinos can be of any race.

Government
The Village Council is composed of John Mahoney (Mayor), James Pavlatos (Commissioner of Accounts & Finances), Nicole Milovich-Walters (Commissioner of Streets & Public Improvements), Dan Polk (Commissioner of Police and Public Safety), and G. Darryl Reed (Commissioner of Building and Public Property).  Marie Arrigoni is the elected Clerk.

At the federal level, Palos Park is in the Illinois 3rd congressional district.  At the state level, it is divided among the 14th, 18th, and 41st Illinois Senate districts and the 26th, 35th, and 82nd Illinois House districts.

Education 
Residents in eastern portions are in Palos School District 118:
Palos South Middle School 
Palos East Elementary School (in Palos Heights)
Palos West Elementary School

High school students in eastern portions are served by Consolidated High School District 230's Amos Alonzo Stagg High School.

Southwest Suburban Montessori School is located in Palos Park.

Palos Park Public Library was founded in 1936 and has been part of the village government since 1945.

Transportation 
Palos Park has a station on Metra's SouthWest Service, which provides rail service to Chicago's Union Station on weekdays and Saturdays.

Notable people
Jane M. Barnes, Illinois state politician
Sean M. Morrison, Cook County commissioner and chair of the Cook County Republican Party
Lee Roupas
Zay N. Smith, columnist and author known for his work at the Chicago Sun-Times including the Mirage investigative series in 1978 and the QT column which ran from 1995 to 2008. Smith was raised in Palos Park.
Wanda Stopa

References

External links

Pictures of Palos Park

Villages in Illinois
Villages in Cook County, Illinois
Chicago metropolitan area
Populated places established in 1914
1914 establishments in Illinois